Sonar or SONAR is a technique that uses sound propagation under water.

Sonar or SONAR may also refer to:

Companies
 Sonar Entertainment, a television production company
 Sonar Kollektiv, a German record label
 Sonar Music, at Fox Studios Australia
 Sonar Radio, an online radio station based in Singapore
 Sonar Records, an English record label

Entertainment
 Sonar (band), a Belgian musical group
 Sonar (comics), a DC Comics fictional character
 Sonar (Transformers), a fictional character
 Sónar, a music festival in Barcelona, Spain
 "Sonar", a radio single of the Mexican Electro/Pop band Belanova
 Sonar Kella, a 1974 Indian novel and film
 Vivek Sonar (born 1976), Indian flautist

Computing
 Sonar (mobile application)
 SONAR (Symantec), a technology used in Norton-security software
 SonarQube, formerly named Sonar, a software quality management platform
 Cakewalk Sonar, digital audio workstation software
 Mouse Sonar, a computer accessibility feature in Microsoft Windows

Other
 Sonar (keelboat), a sailboat
 Sonar River, India
 Kafil Uddin Sonar (1940s–2019), Bangladeshi politician
 Animal echolocation or bio sonar, the use of sound to navigate and identify objects

See also
 Sonnar